Zudkerque is a commune in the Pas-de-Calais department in the Hauts-de-France region of France.

Geography
Zutkerque is located 11 miles (17 km) northwest of Saint-Omer, at the D226 road junction with the D191.

History
Zutkerque had a castle in Roman times, known as the Promontory.
Mentioned for the first time in 1084, its name comes from Dutch and means "South church" (compare nearby Nortkerque).

In 1396, Philip the Bold, Duke of Burgundy stayed at the castle. The English occupied it in the year 1405. Louis XI took it back in 1477 and king Henry VII fought and won it again in 1488. Finally, in 1542 the French, under Antoine de Bourbon, duke of Vendôme, re-took it and completely destroyed the castle.

In May 1595, the village church was looted by the French. On 7 August 1635, a body of Spanish troops, from Saint-Omer, seized the town. In 1638, the French seized the village back again.

Population

Places of interest
 The church of St.Martin, dating from the sixteenth century.
 The ruins of the château de La Montoire, dating from the fourteenth century.

See also
Communes of the Pas-de-Calais department

References

External links

 Official website of the commune of Zutkerque 

Communes of Pas-de-Calais